is an anime television series produced by Liden Films. Centering around characters from Level-5's 2017 video game, Layton's Mystery Journey, part of the Professor Layton franchise, the series began airing on Fuji TV's Adventure Sunday programming block from April 8, 2018 and concluded on March 31, 2019. Novelisations of episodes 1-9 and 11-13 were published by Shōgakukan's Junior Bunko in four three-case installments.

Plot
Taking place after the events of the prologue to Millionaires' Conspiracy, the series follows Katrielle Layton, daughter of the renowned Professor Hershel Layton, who has set up the Layton Detective Agency alongside her self-appointed assistant, Ernest Greeves, and taken on a client-in-residence in the form of an amnesiac talking dog she dubs Sherl. Together, the trio take on all kinds of requests to solve mysterious cases troubling their fellow Britons.

Cast
The anime features an all-new main cast.
 
Kana Hanazawa as Katrielle Layton - A quirky and enthusiastic young detective who aims to solve any case, no matter how strange.
Jūrōta Kosugi as Sherlo / Sherl - A talking dog adopted by Katrielle, who can only be understood by a select few.
Kyōsuke Ikeda as Noah Montol / Ernest Greeves - Katrielle's devoted and mildly infatuated assistant at the Agency.
Yōhei Tadano as Darjeeling Aspoirot / Ercule Hastings - A police detective who often requests Katrielle's aid.
Hibiku Yamamura as Geraldine Royer / Emiliana Perfetti - A police profiler and investigative rival of Katrielle.
Kōichi Yamadera as Professor Hershel Layton - A legendary puzzle-solving archaeologist and father to Katrielle, who mysteriously disappeared when she was a child.
Sōma Saitō as Luke Triton - The Professor's faithful assistant from many years ago.

Other roles are retained by the original game cast, with the exception of a minor role occupied by Tadano, which was recast. The passing of Tetsuo Gotō on November 6, 2018 necessitated the recasting of his character, previously featured in the series' 28th episode, for episodes 47 and 48.

Production
The series was first officially revealed in December 2017, following a previous report that a Professor Layton anime was in production. The 50-episode series is produced by Liden Films and directed by Susumu Mitsunaka, animation director of the original game, with creative direction and series composition by series creator Akihiro Hino, music by series stalwart Tomohito Nishiura, and character design by Yoko Takada, based in part on Takuzō Nagano's original designs. 

The series began airing in Japan on April 8, 2018, as part of Fuji TV's Adventure Sunday programming block. Bomanbridge Media have distribution rights to the series in other Asian territories. It features adaptations of the twelve cases from the original game with new story elements, alongside a large number of original standalone mysteries and an all-new story arc featuring originating series protagonists Professor Hershel Layton and Luke Triton. Many episodes pay homage to a diverse array of popular media properties, making pastiche of Bewitched, Bayside Shakedown, and Iron Chef, and reference to a range of others, including Mission: Impossible, Friday the 13th,  and Marvel Comics' Spider-Man.

The first half of the series featured opening theme  by Kana Adachi, who also portrays a recurring character, and ending theme  by Kana Hanazawa, who occasionally hums the tune in-character as Katrielle.

In conjunction with the series, Takara Tomy released a line of "puzzle-solving charm" accessories, usable in the mobile and Switch versions of the original game via near-field communication. As part of their promotion, different charms were featured in Katrielle's outfit both across stories and in an alternating set of variants of the original opening animation. A competition was also held, the goal of which was to design an outfit for Katrielle which would then appear on-screen.

Episode list

References

External links
 

Anime television series based on video games
Liden Films
Professor Layton
Fuji TV original programming